Rune Ingemar Hubert Franzén (3 May 1927 – 9 February 1985) was a Swedish middleweight weightlifter who won three medals at the world and European Championships in 1954–55. He competed at the 1956 Summer Olympics, but failed to complete the press event.

References

1927 births
1985 deaths
Olympic weightlifters of Sweden
Weightlifters at the 1956 Summer Olympics
European Weightlifting Championships medalists
World Weightlifting Championships medalists
People from Tingsryd Municipality
Sportspeople from Kronoberg County